Jurassic Park is a rail shooter arcade game developed and released by Sega in 1994. It is based on the 1993 film of the same name. The game cabinet resembles the rear of the Ford Explorer tour vehicles used in the film. The player, equipped with a joystick, must shoot dinosaurs that appear on-screen throughout the game.

The game includes a moving seat, also used in Sega's 1991 light gun shooter Rail Chase. The seat is powered by hydraulic pistons to move the seat according to action on the screen. The game's graphics blend two-dimensional sprites and three-dimensional polygons to give the sense of movement. Jurassic Park was the first game of this genre to include 3D environments.

The game was followed by two arcade sequels, The Lost World: Jurassic Park in 1997, and Jurassic Park III in 2001. Another arcade game, titled Jurassic Park Arcade, was released in 2015 and is based on the first three films in the Jurassic Park series.

Gameplay
The game takes place on Isla Nublar a few months after the events of the film. The player fends off a vehicle from dinosaur attacks with infinite automatic weaponry. A joystick is used to play, rather than a light gun. Dinosaurs include Tyrannosaurus, Velociraptor, Dilophosaurus, Gallimimus, Brachiosaurus, Ankylosaurus and Triceratops as well as the non-dinosaur creatures such as ichthyosaurs, and pterosaurs. Tyrannosaurus is the only boss enemy in the game.

Fences and large rocks that block the player's path must be shot at to avoid running into them. The game ends with the dinosaurs being caged once again.

Reception
In Japan, Game Machine listed Jurassic Park on their April 1, 1994 issue as being the third most-successful upright/cockpit arcade game of the month. Edge called the game a "shameful Line of Fire/Rail Chase-style shoot 'em up". Reviewers for Games World: The Magazine rated it 63 out of 100, and also compared it to Rail Chase. They commended the graphics but found that the gameplay soon becomes repetitive.

Shacknews reviewed the game in 2016, and found the graphics outdated compared to other arcade games of the mid-1990s. Shacknews considered the gameplay to be "pretty mindless" for an on-rail shooter, stating that the game could have used more time in development. In 2021, Daniel Kurland of Comic Book Resources called it an "excellent cooperative experience" and stated "the Jeep-like arcade cabinet is a simple but effective touch".

See also
Jurassic Park
List of Jurassic Park video games

References

External links

1994 video games
Arcade video games
Arcade-only video games
Dinosaurs in video games
Jurassic Park video games
Video games based on adaptations
Rail shooters
Sega-AM3 games
Sega arcade games
Sega System 32 games
Video games developed in Japan
Video games set in Costa Rica
Video games set on fictional islands